The  1975-76 French Rugby Union Championship was won by  Agen   beating Béziers in the final.

Formula 
The "elite"  (group A) were formed by five pools of eight clubs.

Were 25 the teams of group A qualified for the knockout stages with seven team coming from group B, also formed by 40 teams.

Both group were arranged in 5 pools of 8 teams.

Qualification round

Group  A 

The team are here listed in ranking order, in bold, the team qualified.

Group B

The teams qualified are here listed:

Knockout stages

"Last 32" 
In bold the clubs qualified for the next round

"Last 16" 
In bold the clubs qualified for the next round

Quarter of finals 
In bold the clubs qualified for the next round

Semifinals

Final

External links
 Compte rendu finale de 1976 lnr.fr

1976
France 1976
Championship